Chambly is a commune in the Oise department in northern France. Chambly station has rail connections to Beauvais and Paris.

Population

Sport
FC Chambly is based in the commune.

See also
 Communes of the Oise department

References

Communes of Oise